Sampooran (Urdu: سمپورن, literal English translation: "complete/perfect") is the debut album of the Pakistani rock band Mekaal Hasan Band, released on January 8, 2004. Singles from the album included "Rabba", released in 2003 and "Sajan", released in 2004.

Concept
The tunes on "Sampooran" were written incorporating traditional material from the eastern classical tradition and adapting these with music which was based on the jazz rock fusion explosion of the seventies. It possesses arguably the finest musical arrangements that have ever been experienced in the country, and the compositions really light up the album. The album starts with the lukewarm “Sajan” whose lyrics have been taken from a kaafi written by Shah Hussain. A moderate mix of acoustic guitars and percussion and some sweet flute playing renders this a really good opening track. “Waris Shah” is next, with its Yanni-isque musical intonations and lyrics inspired from texts by Amrita Preetam. The album seems to be getting into a groove, as the vocals start getting tuned up and the music gets more and more passionate. A classically inspired flute arrangement mixed with soft bass drums and Javed Bashir does total justice with the lyrics. The song has probably lingered on a bit and some pieces seem a bit lengthy, but overall it is the vocals that stand out on “Waris Shah” more than anything else.

“Rabba” is one of the best songs on the album. A Pink Floyd like opening and again, lyrics taken from a Shah Hussain kafi are enough on their own to guarantee a fine number, but that is not all this track is about. This is also the only track on which a Bass touch has been given, and a video for “Rabba” has been included on the CD.

“Sanwal” is the part of the album where it is beginning to reach its crescendo and the music is getting more and more intense yet it still sounds brilliant. Mekaal Hassan Band had earlier released this song as a single with Ustaad Riaz Ali Khan leading the vocals to a brilliantly composed number. The lyrics are taken from the poetry of Farhat Abbas Shah. The cunningly conceived rises and falls of this song render it a very intense and captivating melody, and this is also the first track of the album which has Urdu lyrics.

The title track “Sampooran” is more of an instrumental number and features a vast array of creative genius at the mercy of a group of people ready to explore its outer horizons. As the name suggests, it is classically inspired and carries on the momentum built by “Rabba” and “Sanwal”.

“Darbari” is where the band reaches the summit in the album and it sounds absolutely superb. Fabulous musical arrangements and a massive performance by Javed Bashir make this the absolute best track on the album. It captivates you and forces you into a feeling of being in a Mughal Darbaar. The lyrics are in Persian. Yet the intensity is so great that you can't help but go into a trance.

“Ya Ali” is almost like an anti climax after 3 absolutely stunning tracks. It is softer in composition, lighter on instruments, although it has the best guitar arrangement on the album and the tune is associated more with Ustaad Salamat Ali Khan, who as Mekaal admits, inspired this song. The last track on the album is Late Moon, a solo which features lengthy flute and percussion sessions.

Track listing
All music composed by Mekaal Hasan Band.

Personnel
All information is taken from the CD.

Mekaal Hasan Band
 Mekaal Hasan – lead guitar
 Javed Bashir – lead vocals
 Mohammad Ahsan Papu – flute
 Sameer Ahmed – bass guitar

Additional musicians
Keyboards: Farhan Albert
Drums: John "Gumby" Louis Pinto
Drums & Percussion: Pete Lockett
Guitars and Bass: Michael Mondesir

Production
Produced by Mekaal Hasan
Recorded & Mixed at Digital Fidelity Studio, Lahore, Punjab
Guitar sound engineer: Mekaal Hasan
Assisted by Mekaal Hasan

References

External links
 Official Website

2004 debut albums
Mekaal Hasan Band albums
Urdu-language albums